SAIC may refer to:
SAIC Motor, a Chinese automaker formerly named Shanghai Automotive Industry Corporation
School of the Art Institute of Chicago, one of America's largest accredited independent schools of art and design, located in the Loop in Chicago, Illinois
Science Applications International Corporation, an American government contractor
 The former name of Leidos, the company that spun off the current SAIC in 2013 
Scottish Aquaculture Innovation Centre
Single antenna interference cancellation, a promising technology to boost the capacity of GSM networks without any needed change in the network
South African Indian Congress, an organization founded in 1924 in Natal (now KwaZulu-Natal), South Africa
Special Agent in Charge, a detective or investigator for a state, county, municipal, federal or tribal government
State Administration for Industry and Commerce, an abolished authority in the People's Republic of China responsible for advancing legislation concerning the administration of industry and commerce